The BMW VI was a water-cooled V-12 aircraft engine built in Germany in the 1920s. It was one of the most important German aero engines in the years leading up to World War II, with thousands built. It was further developed as the BMW VII and BMW IX, although these saw considerably less use. It was also produced in the Soviet Union as the M-17 and Japan as the Kawasaki Ha-9.

Design and development
The BMW VI was the first twelve-cylinder engine built by the BMW. It essentially consisted of two cylinder banks from the six-cylinder BMW IV bolted to a common cast aluminium crankcase at a 60-degree included angle between the cylinder banks. Series production commenced in 1926 after type approval had been granted. From 1930 on, after 1000 engines of the BMW VI type had already been delivered, Germany was again permitted to construct military aircraft. The sudden additional demand resulted in the production figures increasing rapidly. In 1933 the BMW VI was used for BMW's first experiments with direct fuel injection.

The BMW VI was the chosen source of power for numerous record-breaking and long-distance flights, including an east-to-west crossing of the Atlantic in 1930 and a round-the world flight in 1932, both by Wolfgang von Gronau in an open Dornier Wal flying boat powered by two BMW VI engines.

The BMW VI was put to unusual use as a power unit for the "Rail Zeppelin" high-speed railcar.
Many versions of the BMW VI engine were developed, and it was built under license in Japan and the Soviet Union. This was further evidence of the reliability of an engine with which BMW made a fundamental contribution to the build-up of German air transport. At least 9,200 were built between 1926 and 1938. The engine was license-built in the Soviet Union under the supervision of Mikulin, who then further developed it as the M-17. More license built engines were produced by Kawasaki Heavy Industries in Japan as the Kawasaki Ha9 (long designation:- Army Type 98 850hp Liquid Cooled In-line).

Variants
5.5, 6 or 7.3 denotes compression ratio. No additional letter denotes BMW carburetor and direct-drive propeller (7.3), u denotes a propeller reduction gear (7.3u), z denotes Zenith carburetor (7.3z), zu denotes Zenith carburetor and propeller reduction gear (7.3zu).

BMW VI 5.5
 Compression ratio 5.5:1,  at up to 1600 rpm at sea level
BMW VI 6.0
 Compression ratio 6:1,  at up to 1650 rpm at sea level, 80 Octane fuel
BMW VI 7.3
 Compression ratio 7.3:1  at up to 1700 rpm at sea level, 87 Octane fuel

Mikulin M-17 Licence production in the USSR

Kawasaki Ha9 (long designation:- Army Type 98 850hp Liquid Cooled In-line) licence production in Japan by Kawasaki

Applications

 Albatros L 77v
 Arado Ar 64
 Arado Ar 65
 Arado Ar 68
 Arado SSD I
 Dornier Do 10
 Dornier Do 14
 Dornier Do 17
 Focke-Wulf Fw 42
 Heinkel He 45
 Heinkel He 51
 Heinkel He 59
 Heinkel He 60
 Heinkel He 70
 Heinkel He 111
 Junkers F.24ko
 Kawasaki Type 92 
 Kawasaki Ki-10
 Messerschmitt M.20
 Polikarpov R-5 prototype
 Schienenzeppelin
 Tupolev TB-3

Specifications (BMW VI 7.3z {direct drive})

See also

References

Further reading
 

BMW aircraft engines
1920s aircraft piston engines